Stanley Jack Rubinstein (17 January 1890 – 14 February 1975) was a British solicitor who specialised in copyright law, a novelist and historian.

Biography 
Rubinstein was born in Kensington, the eldest son of Joseph Samuel Rubinstein (1852-1915) and Isabella Alexandra Marks (1864-1960).  He had two brothers, Harold (1891- 1975) and Ronald (1896-1947), and a sister Edna (born 1893).

Rubinstein followed his father as senior partner of the law firm Rubinstein, Nash & Co, where he also worked with his brothers Harold and Ronald at offices in Gray's Inn.  His father had established the practice in 1889 with Daniel Leggatt, as Leggatt, Rubinstein & Co.  The firm developed an expertise in publishing matters.

Prior to World War I, he ran a concert party, "The Mixed Pickles", who entertained youth clubs in London. He wrote and performed songs, some of which were published.

Stanley Rubinstein married Vera Solomon on 24June 1915 at the New West End Synagogue in StPetersburgh Place, Bayswater, West London. His daughter Joan and son Anthony also worked for the family law firm, as did his grandson John Rubinstein. The firm merged with Manches in 1994, and Penningtons bought Manches in a pre-pack administration in 2013.

In 1924, he was a founder member and organising secretary of the Telephone Users' Protection Association. Writing to The Times in 1927, he gave his address as Wrenhope, Frogmill Farm, Hurley, Berkshire. In 1967, he sat on an appeal committee to raise funds to purchase one of Thomas Hudson's portraits of Handel (1756), for the National Portrait Gallery. The appeal was successful. He was the chairman of Burke Publishing until 1975, and solicitor for the Henry Wood National Memorial Trust.

He appeared as a castaway on the BBC Radio programme Desert Island Discs on 11 August 1969 where he discussed his proposals for introducing copyright protection for elaborated ideas.

Other family members 
Stanley's brother Harold Rubinstein was the brother in law of Victor Gollancz, and acted on the defence of Radclyffe Hall's novel, The Well of Loneliness on obscenity charges in 1928.  Harold's elder son, Michael Rubinstein acted for Penguin Books in the prosecution of D.H. Lawrence's novel Lady Chatterley's Lover for obscenity in 1960.  Harold's younger son Hilary Rubinstein became a publisher and literary agent.

Bibliography

References

Further reading 
 

1890 births
Place of birth missing
1975 deaths
Place of death missing
20th-century British lawyers
British Jews
British non-fiction writers
British songwriters
British male novelists
20th-century British novelists
20th-century British male writers
Male non-fiction writers